Jone Delai (born September 5, 1967) is a Fijian sprinter. Competing mostly over 100 metres, his personal best is 10.26 seconds.

Delai won a bronze medal in 100 metres at the 1990 Oceanian Championships, and became Oceanian champion over both 100 and 200 metres in 1994. Jone competed in the 1996  and 2000 Summer Olympics. In 1998 he became the California Junior College 100 meters champion tying his personal best.

Jone Delai held the title of Fastest Man in the Pacific, with a time of 10.34s in the 100m sprints which was a South Pacific Games record. The SPG Record & his personal achieved best now comes in 2nd to reigning sprint king, Banuve Tabakaucoro's 10.22s for the 100m sprint.

Achievements

External links
 

1967 births
Living people
Fijian male sprinters
Athletes (track and field) at the 1996 Summer Olympics
Athletes (track and field) at the 2000 Summer Olympics
Olympic athletes of Fiji
Athletes (track and field) at the 1998 Commonwealth Games
Athletes (track and field) at the 2006 Commonwealth Games
Commonwealth Games competitors for Fiji
I-Taukei Fijian people
People educated at Suva Grammar School
20th-century Fijian people
21st-century Fijian people